Topkapı—Ulubatlı is an underground station on the M1 line of the Istanbul Metro. It is located in eastern Fatih between the neighborhoods of Karagümrük and Topkapı in Istanbul. An out-of-system transfer to Vatan station on the T4 light-rail line is available as well as connections to İETT city buses. Topkapı—Ulubatlı was opened on 3 September 1989 as part of the first rapid transit line in Istanbul as well as Turkey and is one of the six original stations of the M1 line. The station is right next to the Byzantine-era Theodosian Walls of Constantinople. The station gets part of its name from the 15th century soldier, Ulubatlı Hasan who was one of the first Ottoman soldiers to scale the walls during the Fall of Constantinople.

Layout

References

Railway stations opened in 1989
1989 establishments in Turkey
Istanbul metro stations
Fatih